Forensic limnology is a sub-field of freshwater ecology, which focuses especially on the presence of diatoms in crime scene samples and victims. Different methods are used to collect this data but all identify the ratios of different diatom colonies present in samples and match those samples with locations at the crime scene.

Use of diatoms
Diatoms are diverse microscopic algae with silica cell walls that have different characteristics such as color, shape, and size. There are 8,000 known species of diatoms. Diatoms do not have specialized nutrient and water conducting tissues, which affects their dispersion throughout ecosystems. These microscopic organisms mainly inhabit freshwater environments because of their inability to survive the cleaning agents present in domestic water sources.

Benefits of diatoms
Diatoms are identifiable based on each species' unique silica cell walls (known as "frustules") and vary depending on their environment. Because they have determinant properties diatoms create flora profiles for scientists. When these microscopic algae die, their frustules become a part of the water sediment. The frustules of the deceased organisms can be compared with the living diatoms to determine characteristics of their environment. In early spring and the fall, the ratio of living diatoms to dead diatoms is high, whereas, in summer and winter the amount of dead diatoms outpopulates the living. Based on this known information, diatoms can verify the time of year that samples were taken. Different types of diatoms can also be used to identify the properties of a sample's ecosystem. For example, a higher ratio of periphytic diatoms (i.e., those that are attached to a substrate), the higher the vegetation concentration, and the shallower the water. The reason diatoms are a common tool to match water environments is because of the variability of their populations are predictable and constant, the organisms can be identified by using the light microscope, and their silica cell walls allow for preservation.

Disadvantages of diatoms
Diatoms do not inhabit domestic water sources, which limits the situations that diatoms can be used to create flora profiles or time of death estimations. Diatoms can only tell when or where evidence was found in some situations and not the time of death if there is no body fluid sample available to be collected. If a body is placed in freshwater post mortem then diatoms cannot be used to evaluate the time of death. Without the inhalation of water and some circulation present in the victim, the diatoms will not be able to enter the alveolar system and bloodstream making it difficult to extract a reliable sample. Another issue with the use of diatoms in order to provide evidential support is that diatoms can also be found on clothes, in food and drink, or air.  Because the body can preserve these microscopic algae, the presence of diatoms may not only be on a victim or suspect through their relation to a crime scene, which affects the reliability of the results collected from a scene. Diatoms can also be destroyed based on the biological make up of the body it encounters, this could affect the results in a criminal investigation.

Diatom testing
Materials taken from victims, suspects, or the crime scene can be tested to match locations of where the samples derived.

In order to use diatom testing there are some guidelines that scientists must follow. To get a more accurate result there must be at least 20 diatoms in a 100 microliter sample. When dealing with testing on a human body, having five complete diatoms from more than two different organs will also give a positive diagnosis. Samples are taken from bone marrow, lung, spleen, liver, kidney, brain tissue, or from the area where the crime was discovered or occurred. There are a number of different extraction methods, the most commonly used being the "acide digestion method", which is fast and inexpensive.

When diatom testing on an organic sample scientists use phase contrast microscopy. While observing the diatoms are tallied and organized based on their different species. The ratio of specific specimen of diatoms in the water will have a similar ratio to the sample that is taken from the site where the diatoms were transferred. Scientists use this to match materials and people to specific locations at a crime scene. A diatom database (started in 2006) can be used as the "fingerprint system" for diatoms: a computer identifies diatoms to species based on shape and color characteristics. However, as of 2012, the database was not complete and was not used in courts.

Time of death estimation
When using diatom testing, scientists observe the amount of diatoms present on the organism and may be able to estimate a generalized time of death. For example, if there are fewer than 20 different species of colonizing diatoms, then the organism's death could have been within the previous 7 to 12 days, but, if there are more than 50 different colonies of diatoms then it is determined that death possibly occurred several weeks ago. Certain diatoms narrow the time frame to more exact dates. For instance, late colonizers, such as Ankistrodesmus algae, may not start to colonize on an organism until 30 days after its death.

Legal application
As of 2012, a small percentage of forensic limnology is used as evidence in courts. The presence of diatoms in air, food, drink, and close contact is not variable enough to be supportive evidence in determining locations of events. Even so, an investigation requires the use of forensic limnology in order to estimate time of death, location of drowning, and the determining of suspect. If the results of forensic limnology are not used in prosecution, the results are used to understand the crime.

References

Limnology
Freshwater ecology